Dante "Taz" Roberson (born in 1972 in Stanford, California) is an American drummer, musical director, and record producer from the San Francisco Bay Area.

Career

Roberson is known foremost as a versatile drummer with years of musical experience in jazz, rock, Latin, funk, R&B, hip-hop, and gospel. His career history spans 20 years.

Roberson was raised in the San Francisco Bay Area, and is a self-taught drummer. He began playing professionally at the age of 16 with Daryl Coley. Remaining true to his gospel roots, Roberson continues to play at his local church and has recorded with artists such as Demetrius Tolefree, James Jackson and Juanita Wynn. He started touring with Oakland-based group African Rain and Baba Olatunji. Roberson's interest in jazz, fusion and world music was further developed while playing with musicians including Robert Stewart, Joe Lucito, Juan Escovito, Ricardo Scales & Lloyd Gregory.

Roberson can be seen on Comedy Central's "Weekends at the DL" where he performs with the Dwayne Wiggins Band.

Roberson has performed with a wide variety of artists, such as Najee, Robert Stewart, Carl Willer, Ivan Johnson, 98 Degrees, The Coup, The B.L.A.C.K Experience, Marcus Miller, Demetrius Tolefree, Chico DeBarge & El Debarge, ICON, YoLa, Rolando Al-Anan, Regina Belle, Eric Benet, X-Ecutioners, Kenny Muhammad, Richie Rich (rapper), Skylar Jett, Tony! Toni! Tone!, Tank, Yo-Yo (rapper), Too Short, Keith Washington, Juan Escarito, Ricardo Scales, Lloyd Gregory, Daryl Coley, James Jackson, Ivan Johnson, Juanita Wynn, Byron Cage, Oakland Africans, Vernon Hall, Mike Dinkins, Rodney Gadsen, Benai, Silky, AMP, Sam Bostic, Larry Braggs of Tower Of Power, Robin Duhe of Maze, Masters of the Old School, Slick Rick, Ray Obiedo, Rusty Allen of Sly & the Family Stone, En Vogue, The Whispers, T.W.O., Cameo, Big Boi (rapper),Stephanie Mills, Tony Saunders, Carl Wheeler, Skip Soder, and many others.

Director and producer
Roberson, as musical director and producer, has collaborated on television, film, commercial, and video game projects. Roberson has been musical director for Robin Duhe (formerly of Maze (band)), and Hip-Hop Artist Slick Rick.

Mentors
Roberson cites Dennis Chambers, Floyd Kennedy, Chris Daddy Dave, Gorden Campbell and Mike Johnston as his music mentors.

Discography

Gospel Music
Juanita Wynn – Juanita Wynn
Demetrius Tolefree – Saved
James Jackson – Raise the Roof
Endurance – Live from Oakland
Harold Pauley & Unlimited Praise – True Praises
James Jackson – Phase two
Leggit Brothers – Leggit Brothers
Valerie Turner – Wisdom

R&B
USAM – USAM
Dwayne Wiggins – Eyes Never Lie
Robin Duhe – Live at Qs

Hip Hop
The Coup –
The B.L.A.C.K. Experience –

Jazz
Joe Lucido – Monterey Bay
Dwayne Wright – Confusion
Perfect Harmony – Groove Plus
Lloyd Gregory – Freefalling
Ricardo Scales – Musical Skills
Jonathon LaRue – Perfection
Stacy Kane – Stacey Kane Trio

Neo Soul
Juan E. – Boom Tap
Ebony – Just Another Day

Concert CDs/DVDs 
Live at the Fillmore – Dwayne Wiggins

Latin
Rolando Alan

External links
Dante Roberson web site
Page at Pearl Drums website
Weekends at the D.L.
LoveKraft

1972 births
Living people
African-American drummers
RandB producers
Musicians from Oakland, California
Record producers from California
20th-century American drummers
American male drummers
21st-century American drummers
20th-century American male musicians
21st-century American male musicians
20th-century African-American musicians
21st-century African-American musicians